FC Locarno is a Swiss football club based in Locarno in the Italian-speaking canton of Ticino in southern Switzerland.

As of the 2019–20 season, Locarno play in the Swiss sixth level, 2. Liga.

History
The club, founded in 1906, spent most of its history in lower levels, but also had several spells in the top Swiss level ( in 1930–31, 1933–36, 1945–53 and 1986–87).

Notable former players

Former coaches
 :da:Carlos Pintér (1954-1955)
 Wenzel Halama (1986–1987)
 Paul Schönwetter (1995–1998), (2008–2009)
  Roberto Chiappa (2005)
  Arno Rossini (2005–2008)

References

External links
 
Soccerway.com profile 

 
Football clubs in Switzerland
Association football clubs established in 1906
Locarno
1906 establishments in Switzerland